The Lost Books of the Odyssey is a 2007 novel by Zachary Mason, republished in 2010. It is a reimagination of Homer's Odyssey.

Mason, who wrote the book while working full-time, won first prize and initial publication in a 2007 competition sponsored by Starcherone Books, an independent publisher in Buffalo, New York.  The Los Angeles Times reviewed the book, and it became a finalist in the New York Public Library's Young Lions Fiction competition in 2009. The book garnered additional positive reviews upon re-publication with Farrar, Straus, and Giroux.

Jonathan Galassi, president of Farrar, Straus and Giroux, noticed the book and worked with Mason to craft a second edition of the book, reducing its length and making other modifications to the content. The result was more widely reviewed to acclaim.

Plot
A series of short stories following the general theme of Odysseus, discussing fragments from the 'Iliad' and the 'Odyssey', changing narrator and subject on very regular occasion for a total of 44 fragments.

References

2007 American novels
Farrar, Straus and Giroux books
Self-published books
2007 debut novels
Novels based on the Odyssey